The 2009 Schalfkogel avalanche was an avalanche which occurred in Sölden, Austria, on 2 May 2009. Six people were killed, five Czechs and one Slovak, when the disaster struck in the  Schalfkogel mountain range. The corpses were discovered to have been frozen upon recovery. It was the deadliest avalanche to have occurred in Austria since March 2000. Although avalanches are a regular occurrence in the region, they mainly kill individuals as opposed to entire groups.

Incident
The victims were hiking when they were buried under two and half metres of snow which fell on them. The avalanche occurred on 2 May at the Sölden ski resort. Authorities said the six bodies were retrieved as they ascended Schalfkogel between the ski resorts of Sölden and Obergurgl near the Italian border. A rescue effort had gotten underway on 2 May but was suspended that night. The search had earlier been called off. Rescuers were hampered by severe weather conditions. Witnesses had seen the avalanche and reported it by 16:15 but rescuers were delayed by the snowstorm. As soon as the rescue helicopter was able to land all of the victims had been located within the hour. It is understood four of them quickly died and froze after being buried under the snow, whilst the other two had some oxygen and survived in an unfrozen state until this became impossible. Rescuers said these two might have been rescued.

Survivor
One forty-five-year-old man survived. He was a friend of the victims. He had stayed behind in a mountain hut whilst the others continued on their journey. The bodies were identified by this survivor.

Reaction
The mayor of Sölden, Ernst Schöpf, said: "It [was] clear that conditions were not right for a high-altitude tour on Saturday."

References

Schalfkogel avalanche
Schalfkogel avalanche
2000s avalanches
Natural disasters in Austria 
May 2009 events in Europe
Avalanches in Austria
2009 disasters in Austria